The Beu Sisters are a pop-rock girl group from the U.S. state of Florida, consisting of the sisters Candice (born 1975), Christie (born 1978) and Danielle (born 1987). Originally born and bred in New York City, the Beu Sisters were surrounded by classics of the Broadway stage early on. Their parents were both show business veterans and had performed in some of theater's greatest productions. The family moved to New Smyrna Beach, Florida, in 1988 and, by the end of the 1990s, they had formed an a cappella act. Desmond Child, a noted songwriter, noticed the sisters and helped them to sign a contract with S-Curve Records.

History
In 2002, the Beu Sisters' first album, Decisions, was released. Nine of the thirteen tracks on the album were co-written by them. The album includes the lead single "I Was Only (Seventeen)", for which a music video was filmed. To promote their album, the Beu Sisters management Magus Entertainment secured them as the opening act on Kelly Clarkson and Clay Aiken's 2004 Independent Tour which spanned 32 cities.

In the meantime, the group featured on various soundtracks, including Disney productions: Ella Enchanted, Home on the Range, Disney Girlz Rock, Radio Disney Jingle Jams, Radio Disney Ultimate Jams, The Lizzie McGuire Movie soundtrack, and DisneyMania 2. They appeared on the Because of Winn-Dixie movie soundtrack and also contributed to the movie How to Lose a Guy in 10 Days, featuring Kate Hudson and Matthew McConaughey, in 2003.

After their tour with Kelly Clarkson and Clay Aiken, they were signed to an entertainment deal with Sony/Columbia Records, but delays led them to the unanimous decision to return home and release themselves of all contractual obligations. A new song, "What Do You Do in the Summer (When It's Raining?)", was released to radio in summer 2004.

In 2008, the group started working with music producer On-Dre Mendoza, while Jilaine decided to pursue a degree in marketing. Between 2011 and 2012, the Beu Sisters (minus Jilaine) made a comeback to the music scene and released three EPs in the Beu~tiful series under their own label, Beach Breakz Records.

External links
Beu Sisters on MySpace
Beu Sisters on Facebook

References

American pop music groups
American pop girl groups
American girl groups
Family musical groups
People from New Smyrna Beach, Florida
Musical groups from Florida
Musical groups established in 2002
2002 establishments in Florida
S-Curve Records artists